Klimas may stand for:

People

 Petras Klimas (1891–1969), Lithuanian diplomat, author, historian
 Kastytis Klimas (born 1969), Lithuanian track and field sprint athlete

Lithuanian-language surnames